Carola Rackete (born 8 May 1988 in Preetz, Germany) is a German ship captain who volunteered with the German sea rescue organisation Sea-Watch. In June 2019, she was arrested for docking a migrant rescue ship without authorization in the port of Lampedusa, Italy.

Early life
Rackete was born in Preetz, near Kiel, Germany. She graduated high school in 2007, then studied at Maritime School at Jade University of Applied Sciences in Elsfleth, earning a Bachelor of Science in nautical science and maritime transport in 2011. The B.Sc. in Nautical science at Jade University meets the written examination requirement for the captain's licence of the Federal Maritime and Hydrographic Agency of Germany, which is later acquired on the basis of professional experience only.

In 2018 she earned a master's degree in conservation management from Edge Hill University in England.

Career
Rackete was a navigation officer for two years in scientific expeditions in the Arctic and the Antarctic for the Alfred Wegener Institute for Polar and Marine Research.

For a short period of time, she worked as a conservation volunteer within the Kronotsky Nature Reserve in the Kamchatka Peninsula. Later, Carola Rackete worked as safety officer for Silversea Cruises, an ultra-luxury cruise line headquartered in Monaco. She later worked as second-officer on ships owned by Greenpeace and the British Antarctic Survey.

As of June 2019 Rackete captained , a vessel of 645 gross tonnage, which flies a German flag.
In August 2019, she and fellow activist Pia Klemp refused to accept the Medal of the City of Paris award, accusing the city of Paris of hypocrisy.

In November 2021, Rackete published her call to combat climate change, The Time to Act is Now, with the Rosa Luxemburg Stiftung.

Sea-Watch 3 incident of June 2019
On 12 June, the ship picked up 53 migrants in the Mediterranean off the Libyan coast. Sea-Watch 3 rejected an offer to dock at Tripoli, which is considered unsafe by the European Union and the humanitarian organizations, and headed toward Lampedusa. According to a map they posted, and also to a report by the Süddeutsche Zeitung and other non-governmental organizations (NGOs) this was the nearest safe harbor per maritime law. On 14 June, Italy closed its ports to migrant rescue ships. Italian interior minister Matteo Salvini refused to allow the ship to dock until other European nations had agreed to take the migrants. Ten of the migrants, including children, pregnant women, and those who were ill, were allowed to disembark. On 28 June, Finland, France, Germany, Luxembourg and Portugal offered to take the migrants.

On 29 June, without authorization, Rackete decided to dock. The motivation for this was that according to her the passengers were exhausted. Rackete was arrested by the Italian authorities after docking.

Italian interior minister Matteo Salvini accused Rackete of trying to sink an Italian patrol boat that was trying to intercept her and that her ship collided with, calling the incident an act of war and demanding the Netherlands intervene.

Italian Prime Minister Giuseppe Conte "scrambled to address the matter" at the 2019 G20 Osaka summit. Germany protested the arrest. Crowdfunding appeals in Italy and Germany had raised over €1 million as of 1 July for Sea-Watch legal defense. Fortune called Rackete the "fresh new face" of the European migrant crisis.

Sea-Watch 3 has a mainly German crew but sailed under Dutch flag. In the Netherlands, main government party VVD stated that NGOs that deliberately without permission pick up people should be convicted for facilitating human trafficking. Spokesman Jeroen van Wijngaarden said that: "They are factually not a rescue service but a ferry service." Within the Dutch coalition government, they got support from the CDA, and in the Dutch parliament there basically was a majority that supported this. Nevertheless, the two other parties in the coalition government protested strongly against this statement.

Eventually, Rackete was released from house arrest after a court ruling that she had broken no laws and acted to protect passengers' safety. Rackete's lawyer filed a lawsuit against Salvini for defamation on social media, alleging that he incited his followers to threaten her.

The council of the City of Paris on 12 July 2019 announced that the two captains of  Sea-Watch 3, Pia Klemp and Carola Rackete, will receive the Grand Vermeil Medal, the top award of the City of Paris, for saving migrants at sea, because the two captains symbolized "solidarity for the respect of human lives". Both refused the medal, defining this decision "hypocritical". Klempt wrote in a statement: "You want to award me a medal...because our crews 'work' to rescue migrants from difficult conditions on a daily basis. At the same time your police steal blankets from people you force to live on the streets while you suppress protests and criminalise people who defend the rights of migrants and asylum seekers."

As of July 2019, Rackete was under investigation by Italian authorities for possible criminal activities in regards to undocumented migration. If convicted, Rackete would have faced up to 15 years in prison. In January 2020, on appeal the Italian Supreme Court of Cassation ruled that Rackete should never have been arrested.

On 10 September 2019 she was awarded with the Medal of Honor of the Parliament of Catalonia, given by the president of the Catalan Parliament, in recognition for her humanitarian work. In October 2020, Carola Rakete was awarded the first  award. On 6 May 2021, two days before her 33rd birthday, she was awarded a doctor honoris causa from the University of Namur in Belgium.

On May 19, 2021 a court in Agrigento ruled that no trial should be held, agreeing with a state prosecutor that the actions had been undertaken in an effort to save the lives of the migrants.

Notes

References

Further reading

 

1988 births
Living people
People from Preetz
Alumni of Edge Hill University
German humanitarians
Women humanitarians
German human rights activists
Women human rights activists
Sea captains
European migrant crisis